Kent is a city in King County, Washington, United States. It is part of the Seattle–Tacoma–Bellevue metropolitan area and had a population of 136,588 as of the 2020 census, making it the fourth-largest municipality in greater Seattle and the sixth-largest in Washington state. The city is connected to Seattle, Bellevue and Tacoma via State Route 167 and Interstate 5, Sounder commuter rail, and commuter buses.

Incorporated in 1890, Kent is the second-oldest incorporated city in King County, after Seattle. It is generally divided into three areas: West Hill (mixed residential and commercial along Interstate 5), Valley (primarily industrial and commercial with some medium-density residential; significant parkland along Green River), and East Hill (primarily residential with retail).

History
The Kent area was first permanently settled by European Americans in the 1850s along the banks of what was then the White River. The first settler was Samuel Russell, who sailed the White and Duwamish rivers until he claimed a plot of land southeast of modern-day downtown Kent in the spring of 1853. Russell was followed by several other settlers who quickly staked claims around the area. The settlements were originally known as "White River" and later the town was called "Titusville" after an early settler by the name of James Henry Titus. (There is still a "Titusville Station" sign on Gowe Street near First Avenue). In 1861 a post office was established under the name White River and was located at the farm of David and Irena Neely who settled in modern-day Kent in 1854. In 1855 their farm was attacked by Native Americans when David Neely served as a lieutenant in the Territorial Army. Another settler was Henry L. Yesler, who was the first sawmill operator in Seattle. By 1870 the population was 277 and all of the quality bottom-land had been claimed.

Throughout the 1860s and 70's, grain and forage crops such as wheat, barley, oats, hay, and timothy accounted for much of the annual return of farmers in the valley. During the late 1870s the town discovered hops production as a major source of income. Due to an aphid invasion which affected hops crops in Europe, hops from the Puget Sound area began to command high prices. Hops were shipped from Titusville either by the river or via rail. In 1889 the town was renamed for the County of Kent, the major hops-producing region in England. Ezra Meeker was asked by the Northern Pacific Railroad to name its station. Meeker suggested that it be known as Kent as it was "Hop Capitol of the West". Hops production in the White River valley came to an end soon after its own invasion of aphids in 1891.

Kent was officially incorporated on May 28, 1890, with a population of 793, the second city incorporated in King County. Seattle was the first.

After the turn of the 20th century the area turned to dairy farming and was home to a Carnation condensed milk plant. Flooding from both the Green and the White Rivers was a constant problem. In 1906, flooding changed the course of the White River, which reduced the flood hazard by half. The Green River continued to present problems until the creation of the Howard A. Hanson Dam at Eagle Gorge in 1962.

During and after the Great Depression, Kent was known as the "Lettuce Capital of the World". After WWII, Kent began to grow more rapidly. From 1953 to 1960 the city's size grew twelve-fold. In 1965 Boeing began building in Kent, followed a few years later by other aerospace and high-tech companies.

In 1992, the Greater Kent Historical Society was formed to promote the discovery, preservation and dissemination of knowledge about the history of the greater Kent area. In 1996, the City of Kent purchased the historic Bereiter house, the home of one of Kent's early mayors, for use as the Kent Historical Museum. The museum is operated by the Greater Kent Historical Society.

Geography

Kent is located in southern King County and is part of Seattle's metropolitan area. The city is generally divided into three geographic sections: West Hill, the Green River Valley, and East Hill. Downtown Kent is located on the east side of the valley, about 16 miles from downtown Seattle and downtown Bellevue. Adjoining cities are Renton to the north, Covington to the east, Auburn to the south, Federal Way to the southwest, Des Moines to the west, SeaTac to the northwest, and Tukwila to the north.

Major waterways include the Green River, which flows north through Kent on its way to Puget Sound. The largest lake is Lake Meridian on the city's East Hill. Mount Rainier is a prominent geographical landmark to the southeast.

Transportation
There are several major freeways and highways in or near Kent, including Interstate 5, State Route 167, and State Route 516. Kent is also served by King County Metro transit, with the Kent Station providing service to many destinations, including downtown Seattle by multiple commuter buses, the Sounder commuter rail system, and local buses. Heavy rail service includes two major north–south lines through the Kent Valley, with freight traffic operations by the BNSF and Union Pacific railroads. The Link light rail system is scheduled to be extended to Federal Way in 2024, with intermediate stops at Kent Des Moines station near Highline College and Star Lake station at South 272nd Street.

Parks
Kent's park system includes 73 parks, miniparks, playfields, skateparks, greenbelts, and other related facilities.

Climate
Kent has a warm/cool-summer Mediterranean climate (Köppen Csb).

City landmarks
Kent has designated the following landmarks:

Government

The city is governed by a mayor–council government, with a directly elected mayor and a seven-member city council. Each is elected at-large (that is, by the entire voting population, rather than by districts) to four-year terms. The current mayor is Dana Ralph. The city maintains its own municipal police department, unlike some neighboring municipalities who contract police service out to King County.

Public education
Public primary and secondary education in the vast majority of Kent and a number of neighboring cities and unincorporated areas is governed by the Kent School District. The district includes four high schools, seven middle schools, twenty-eight elementary schools and two academies. The Kent School District also has an individualized graduation and degree program named iGrad that is aimed at dropouts aged 16–21 who are willing to get back to school.

Federal Way Public Schools, which includes a portion of Kent, also has several schools within the city limits. Residents of far east Kent are zoned in the Tahoma School district. A branch of Green River Community College opened in Kent Station in 2007.

Other portions are in the Highline School District and the Renton School District.

Fire protection
The city is served by the Puget Sound Regional Fire Authority with 7 of the departments 13 stations located within municipal boundaries.

Annexation
In keeping with the King County Annexation Initiative, which seeks to annex large urban unincorporated areas into city limits or incorporate new cities out of those areas, the Panther Lake area (known officially as the Kent Northeast Potential Annexation Area) was proposed for annexation to the city of Kent. The annexation was voted on by residents of the potential annexation area on November 3, 2009; the area was officially annexed July 1, 2010.

Economy
The economy of Kent consists of commuters traveling to the main urban centers of the Seattle metropolitan area (particularly downtown Seattle), extensive manufacturing and warehousing within the city, and retail/personal services catering to residents. Kent's manufacturing and distribution area ranks are the 4th largest in the United States.

Corporate headquarters in Kent include Oberto Sausage Company, Seattle Bicycle Supply, Omax Corporation and aerospace manufacturer Blue Origin. Amazon, Boeing, Whirlpool and General Electric operate sizable facilities in the city. Due to its central location within the metropolitan area, Kent is home to a large and growing warehouse district. To honor the 100th anniversary of Oberto Sausage Company's presence in the city, the city designated a section of South 238th Street as Oberto Drive in May 2018.

Boeing
Boeing Kent Space Center was opened with a public dedication ceremony on October 24, 1964. Keynote speakers at the event were William "Bill" Allen, Chairman and CEO of The Boeing Company; future Washington Governor Dan Evans; and Alex Thorton, Mayor of the City of Kent. The event featured public tours of the labs and facilities that were used to build the Lunar Roving Vehicles used in the Apollo program.

Steel
Kent is home to a large steel industry dating back to the early 20th century. Steel and metal manufacturers include:

Salmon Bay Steel Company:  Operated in Kent for 50 years before closing down. Birmingham Steel purchased Salmon bay in 1991. Salmon bay went on to buy Bethlehem Steel (Seattle Steel) in West Seattle. Years after the purchase, complaints were made of pollution in the Green River valley about pollution from the Salmon Bay melting facility, and the facility was shut down.
Puget Sound Steel:  Puget Sound Steel is an independently owned and operated-unique specialty fabricator of reinforcing steel and a supplier of related reinforcement products, since 1961. Puget Sound Steel has been the Northwest's select supplier of fabricated rebar and steel reinforcement to commercial, highway, industrial, and residential building contractors. Works include large scale projects including bridges and skyscrapers.
Pacific Metal Company:  In 1947, started in Seattle and opened a 19,000 square foot plant. The business and facilities continued to grow for 30 years to meet local needs as well as the emerging markets of Alaska. Even the expanded 40,000 square foot warehouse and sales office was deemed insufficient, and in 1979, an 80,000 square foot facility was built south of the city of Seattle in the Kent Valley at Tukwila. In September 2010 PMC moved to a new location just 3 miles SE in the city of Kent, Washington. Pacific Metal Company is a stocking distributor of non-ferrous metals specializing in stainless steel, copper, aluminum, and brass products as well as ferrous products specializing in Cold Rolled, Coated (Zinc and Aluminum) and pre-painted coils and sheets.
TMX Aerospace:  TMX Aerospace, a division of ThyssenKrupp Steel North America; provides materials including steel, brass, and copper as well as exclusive supply chain management support for the Boeing Commercial Airplanes group.

Largest employers
According to the city's 2018 Comprehensive Annual Financial Report, the largest employers in the city are:

Demographics

2010 census
As of the census of 2010, there were 92,411 people, 34,044 households, and 21,816 families residing in the city. The racial makeup of the city was 55.5% White (49.7% Non-Hispanic White), 11.3% African American, 1.0% Native American, 15.2% Asian, 1.9% Pacific Islander, 8.5% from other races, and 6.6% from two or more races. Hispanic or Latino of any race were 16.6% of the population.

There were 34,044 households, of which 37.0% had children under the age of 18 living with them, 43.6% were married couples living together, 14.3% had a female householder with no husband present, 6.1% had a male householder with no wife present, and 35.9% were non-families. 28.1% of all households were made up of individuals, and 7.5% had someone living alone who was 65 years of age or older. The average household size was 2.67 and the average family size was 3.31.

The median age in the city was 33 years. 26.2% of residents were under the age of 18; 10.1% were between the ages of 18 and 24; 30.6% were from 25 to 44; 24.3% were from 45 to 64; and 8.8% were 65 years of age or older. The gender makeup of the city was 49.9% male and 50.1% female.

2000 census
As of the census of 2000, there were 79,524 people, 31,113 households, and 19,601 families residing in the city. The population density was 2,836.7 people per square mile (1,095.4/km2). There were 32,488 housing units at an average density of 1,158.9 per square mile (447.5/km2). The racial makeup of the city was 70.81% White, 8.23% African American, 0.98% Native American, 9.42% Asian, 0.76% Pacific Islander, 4.7% from other races, and 5.37% from two or more races. Hispanic or Latino of any race were 8.13% of the population.

There were 32,998 households, out of which 35.5% had children under the age of 18 living with them, 45.1% were married couples living together, 12.8% had a female householder with no husband present, and 37.0% were non-families. 28.5% of all households were made up of individuals, and 5.8% had someone living alone who was 65 years of age or older. The average household size was 2.53 and the average family size was 3.15.

In the city the population was spread out, with 27.7% under the age of 18, 10.3% from 18 to 24, 35.0% from 25 to 44, 19.6% from 45 to 64, and 7.3% who were 65 years of age or older. The median age was 32 years. For every 100 females, there were 98.4 males. For every 100 females age 18 and over, there were 96.2 males.

The median income for a household in the city was $50,053, and the median income for a family was $61,016. Males had a median income of $43,136 versus $36,995 for females. The per capita income for the city was $21,390. About 8.7% of families and 11.6% of the population were below the poverty line, including 16.7% of those under the age of 18 and 9.3% of those 65 and older.

Recreation and entertainment
In 2003, Kent was named Sports Illustrated'''s Sportstown of the year for Washington. In January 2006, an entertainment center, known as Kent Station, opened in downtown Kent adjacent to the transit station of the same name.

The 2012 Skate America figure skating competition was held in Kent from October 19 to 21, 2012, at ShoWare Center.

In July 2015, Kent hosted the inaugural Junior Roller Derby World Cup.

Riverbend Golf Complex, featuring an 18-hole course which is one of the busiest in Washington state, is located in Kent. An adjacent par 3 course was actively used by locals for years before being shut down in 2017 to make room for a mixed used development.

Events
 Canterbury Faire, an arts festival in mid-August every year at Mill Creek Canyon Earthworks park, which stopped in 2006.
 Kent Cornucopia Days in July
 Kent Farmers Market
 Kent Saturday Market

Entertainment
The accesso ShoWare Center hosts two minor-league sports teams: the Seattle Thunderbirds play ice hockey in the U.S. Division of the Western Hockey League; and the Tacoma Stars plays indoor soccer in the Major Arena Soccer League.

Notable people

 Ely Allen, University of Washington, and Major League Soccer player
 Earl Anthony, professional bowler
 Kelly Bachand, contestant of History Channel's Top Shot Season 1, raised in Kent
 Red Badgro, NFL and MLB player, inductee Pro Football Hall of Fame
 John Bastyr, influential advocate of naturopathic medicine, namesake of Bastyr University
 Joseph and Melissa Batten, Microsoft software developers in 2008 murder case
 Karl Best, former Major League Baseball relief pitcher for Seattle Mariners and Minnesota Twins
 Josie Bissett, actress, Melrose Place Betty Bowen, journalist and art promoter
 Demitrius Bronson, professional football player Miami Dolphins
 John Bronson, professional football tight end for Arizona Cardinals
 Conner Cappelletti, Guam international soccer player
 Ernie Conwell, NFL player
 Rebecca Corry, comedian/actress
 Billy Crook, Major League Soccer (MLS) defender
 Daphne Loves Derby, indie-pop rock band
 Michael Dickerson, professional basketball player, Houston Rockets and Vancouver/Memphis Grizzlies
 Jeff Dye, comedian and actor, was born and grew up in Kent
 Robin Earl, NFL fullback and tight end
 Jason Ellis, professional basketball player
 Kai Ellis, CFL player
 Michelle Font, Miss Washington USA
 The Fung Brothers, comedians, rappers; raised in Kent
 Melissa Goad, actress and model
 Abdulameer Yousef Habeeb, Iraqi artist and calligrapher, lived in U.S. as refugee
 Matt Hague, first baseman for Toronto Blue Jays
 Benjamin Haggerty, rapper Macklemore
 Marcus Hahnemann, professional soccer goalkeeper
 Al Hairston, professional basketball player for Seattle SuperSonics, head coach for Bowling Green University
 Peter Hallock, composer and organist
 Tess Henley, singer-songwriter and pianist
 Shannon Higgins-Cirovski, soccer player in Hall of Fame
 Jeff Jaeger, NFL kicker
 Billy Jones, college baseball player, coach of Appalachian State Mountaineers
 Reggie Jones, NFL cornerback
 Nicole Joraanstad, curler, 2009 Olympic gold medalist
 Mike Karney, college and professional football player
 Stefano Langone, American Idol contestant
 Danny Lorenz, professional hockey player for New York Islanders
 Ellen MacGregor, author
 William M. Marutani, judge
 Kenny Mayne, ESPN analyst
 Victor Aloysius "Vic" Meyers, jazz bandleader and Democratic politician, "Clown Prince of Politics"
 PZ Myers, biology professor at University of Minnesota Morris and intelligent design critic
 Bob Nelson, screenwriter and Almost Live! cast member, Academy Award nominee for Nebraska''
 Danny Pierce, painter, printmaker and sculptor
 Mark Prothero, attorney, defense co-counsel for Green River Killer
 Brenda Raganot, professional bodybuilder
 Simon Peter Randolph, pioneer steamboat captain 
 Dave Reichert, U.S. Representative, Republican Party
 Gary Ridgway, "Green River Killer" (former resident)
 Mike Roberg, NFL tight end
 Jerry "The King" Ruth, professional drag racer
 Peter Schweizer, journalist
 Joshua Smith, Georgetown and UCLA basketball player
 Rick Sortun, former professional football offensive lineman for the St. Louis Cardinals
 Usaia Sotutu, runner who represented Fiji at 1972 Summer Olympics
 Rodney Stuckey, basketball player for Detroit Pistons
 Alameda Ta'amu, NFL player for Kansas City Chiefs
 Harvey Thomas, luthier, built distinctive guitars in 1960s
 Courtney Thompson, UW and US national team volleyball player, set NCAA assist record
 Mason Tobin, professional baseball player
 Kyle Townsend, record producer, composer and musician
 Toussaint Tyler, NFL running back
 Brian Tyms, professional football player, New England Patriots
 Courtney Vandersloot, basketball player and 2021 WNBA Finals Champion for Chicago Sky
 Dave Wainhouse, professional basketball and Major League Baseball player
 Cam Weaver, professional soccer player, Seattle Sounders FC

Sister cities
Kent has the following sister cities:
  Yangzhou, Jiangsu, China	
  Tamba, Hyōgo Prefecture, Japan
  Sunnfjord, Norway

See also

List of companies based in Kent, Washington

References

External links

 City of Kent Government

 
Cities in Washington (state)
Cities in King County, Washington
Cities in the Seattle metropolitan area
Populated places established in 1890
1890 establishments in Washington (state)